Moore Threads Technology Co. Ltd is a Chinese technology company specializing in graphics processing unit (GPU) design, established in October 2020 by, Zhang Jianzhong (张建中), the former global vice-president of Nvidia and general manager of Nvidia China. The company claims to be the first Chinese company to introduce a domestic, "fully featured" GPU solution.

History
In October 2020, the company was founded by former global VP and China GM of Nvidia, Zhang Jianzhong, and subsequently received funding through the first year in three funding rounds from investors such as Shenzhen Capital Group, GGV Capital, Sequoia Capital China, ByteDance and Tencent.

Products
On 31 March 2022, it announced its first products, the MTT S60 for desktop PCs and workstations, and the MTT S2000 for servers, based on the first generation MUSA (Moore Threads Unified System Architecture, also known as "苏堤").

See also
AMD
Biren Technology
Semiconductor industry in China

References

Computer companies established in 2020
Graphics hardware companies